Adam Zertal (1936 – October 18, 2015) was an Israeli archaeologist and a tenured professor at the University of Haifa.

Biography
Adam Zertal grew up in Ein Shemer, a kibbutz affiliated with the Hashomer Hatzair movement. Zertal was severely wounded in the Yom Kippur War.  He later told a reporter for The Jerusalem Post, “I spent a year at Hadassah Hospital in Jerusalem, and I became interested in archaeology. Although I had argued that the Bible was full of myths, I decided after my recovery to travel the land by foot to look for archeological evidence.”

Archaeology career

Zertal claimed to have identified several sites he worked on as being connected to sites, events and characters from the narratives in the Hebrew Bible:
 Joshua's altar. A structure on Mount Ebal identified as an early Israelite altar.
 Sisera's town. Zertal headed the excavations at El-ahwat, which he has identified as the Biblical Harosheth Haggoyim, a fortress described in the Book of Judges as the fortress or cavalry base of Sisera, commander of the army of King Jabin. (Judges 4)
 Foot-shaped enclosures in the Jordan Valley and the hill country west of it. Zertal described them as ceremonial sites used during Iron Age I and probably later, as well. He explained the term "aliya la-regel" (lit.: "rise to the foot"), commonly translated as "pilgrimage", as derived from these enclosures, and saw the use of the expression in connection with the mandatory pilgrimage Temple in Jerusalem as an adaptation of the term to a new situation. Zertal discovered five such sites: Bedhat esh-Sha'ab (near Moshav Argaman), Masua (4) (near Masua), Yafit (3) (near Yafit), el-'Unuq, and the inner and outer enclosures at Mount Ebal.
 Underground quarry (possibly identified s biblical Galgala). In 2009, Zertal headed a team that discovered an ancient underground quarry in the  Jordan Valley. He associated the cave with two Byzantine-period place names, Galgala and Dodekaliton (Greek for "Twelve Stones"), marked on the Madaba map next to each other and at a distance from Jericho that matches the cave's distance from the city. He offered the interpretation that the Byzantines had identified the site as Gilgal, where the Children of Israel had set up the twelve stones they had taken from the Jordan River while crossing it.

Zertal's work was not without controversy, and, in particular, his claims about Mount Ebal, where he worked for nine years, never gained traction within the wider archaeological community. Many archeologists agree that the structure was a site of an early Israelite cultic activity, however, its identification with Joshua's altar is disputed.

References

Bibliography

Israeli archaeologists
Biblical archaeologists
Academic staff of the University of Haifa
2015 deaths
1936 births